Angel Eyes is an album by pianist Joe Bonner which was recorded in 1974 and 1975 and released on the Muse label.

Track listing
All compositions by Joe Bonner except where noted
 "Angel Eyes" (Matt Dennis) – 6:00
 "Love Dance" – 4:40
 "I Do" – 6:08
 "Variations on The Little Chocolate Boy" – 5:32
 "Celebration" – 9:27
 "Interlude" – 3:15

Personnel
Joe Bonner – piano, bamboo flute
Billy Harper – tenor saxophone
Leroy Jenkins – violin
Juni Booth – bass
Jimmy Hopps – drums
Linda Sharrock – vocals

References

Muse Records albums
Joe Bonner albums
1976 albums
Albums produced by Michael Cuscuna